Sealand may refer to:

Places 
 Sealand, Flintshire, a community in Wales
 MoD Sealand, a British military station, formerly RAF Sealand
 Principality of Sealand, a micronation off the coast of Suffolk
 Sealand, Denmark, more commonly spelled "Zealand"

Other uses 
 Sealand Helicopters, a former Canadian transportation company
 Sealand national football team, the association football team that represents the Principality of Sealand
 Sealand of the Pacific, a former aquarium in British Columbia, Canada
 SeaLand, a division of the Maersk Group, an intra-regional container shipping company
 Short Sealand, an amphibious aircraft
 "Sealand", a song by Orchestral Manoeuvres in the Dark from Architecture & Morality
 First Sealand dynasty, an enigmatic series of kings in the Bronze Age

See also 
 
 Sea land (disambiguation)
 Seeland (disambiguation)
 Zealand (disambiguation)
 Zeeland (disambiguation)
 Marineland (disambiguation)
 Waterland (disambiguation)
 Sealant